William Duane Fulton (May 27, 1864 – March 2, 1925) was a Democratic politician in the U.S. state of Ohio who served in the Ohio House of Representatives and was Ohio Secretary of State 1917–1919.

Biography

William Duane Fulton was born at Homer, Licking County, Ohio in 1864. He attended public schools, and graduated from Denison University, Granville, Ohio. He then read law and after admission to the bar, he practiced in Newark, Ohio. He was city solicitor, and member of council.

Fulton was elected as a Democrat to the Ohio House of Representatives to the 79th (1911–1912) and 80th (1913–1914) General  Assemblies. In the 80th Assembly, he authored the bill that Gerrymandered the state's Congressional districts.

In 1916, Fulton was elected Ohio Secretary of State, and served 1917–1919.

Fulton married Josephine W. Wintermuth of Newark. They had three daughters and a son.

Fulton died March, 1925 at Mount Clemens, Michigan

References

Secretaries of State of Ohio
People from Licking County, Ohio
Ohio lawyers
1864 births
1925 deaths
Democratic Party members of the Ohio House of Representatives
Denison University alumni
Burials at Cedar Hill Cemetery, Newark, Ohio
19th-century American lawyers